The 1969–70 Scottish Division One was won by Celtic by thirteen points over nearest rival Rangers. Raith Rovers and Partick Thistle finished 17th and 18th respectively and were relegated to the 1970-71 Second Division.

League table

Results

See also
Nine in a row

References

League Tables

1969–70 Scottish Football League
Scottish Division One seasons
Scot